Verticordia subg. Verticordia is a botanical name for a grouping of similar plant species in the genus Verticordia. This subgenus contains eleven sections, classifying thirty six species, of Alex George's infrageneric arrangement.  A number of anatomical features differentiate the contained species from the other two subgenera.

Verticordia subg. Verticordia
Section Verticordia
the type species for this section, and the genus, is Verticordia plumosa
Section Corymbiformis
the type species for this section, closely related to Verticordia sect. Verticordia,  is Verticordia brownii
Section Micrantha
Section Infuscata
Section Elachoschista
containing a single species, Verticordia verticordina
Section Penicillaris
Section Pilocosta
Section Catocalypta
Section Platandra
Section Recondita
containing a single species, Verticordia humilis
Section Intricata

References 

Schauer, J.C. (1843) Monographia Myrtacearum Xerocarpicarum: 199 
George, A.S. (1991) New taxa, combinations and typifications in Verticordia (Myrtaceae: Chamelaucieae). Nuytsia 7(3): 282

Verticordia
Rosids of Western Australia
Plant subgenera